JSD may refer to:
 Jensen–Shannon divergence
 Jackson system development
 Doctor of Juridical Science, a research doctorate in law
 Japanese School of Detroit
 Jatiya Samajtantrik Dal, Bangladeshi political party